Jean Jacques Idrissa Ndecky (born 10 January 1997) is a Senegalese professional footballer who currently play as a right-back for Albanian club Skënderbeu, on loan from German club Fortuna Düsseldorf II Loan ended in June 2020. Back at Fortuna Düsseldorf .

References

1997 births
Living people
People from Ziguinchor
Senegalese expatriate footballers
Senegalese footballers
Senegal international footballers
Association football defenders
Association football midfielders
KF Skënderbeu Korçë players
Fortuna Düsseldorf II players
Kategoria Superiore players
Senegalese expatriate sportspeople in Albania
Expatriate footballers in Albania
Expatriate footballers in Germany
Senegalese expatriate sportspeople in Germany
Senegal youth international footballers